Nils-Eric Gustafsson  (December 30, 1922 – 2017) was a Swedish politician and a member of the Centre Party.

References

Centre Party (Sweden) politicians
1922 births
2017 deaths